This is a list of 'Indiana State Sycamores football players in the NFL Draft.

Key

Selections
Source:

Notable undrafted playersNote: No drafts held before 1920''

References

Lists of National Football League draftees by college football team

Indiana State Sycamores NFL Draft